Krzęcin  is a village in the administrative district of Gmina Skawina, within Kraków County, Lesser Poland Voivodeship, in southern Poland.

The village has a population of 1,400.

References

Villages in Kraków County